Below is a list of role-playing game supplements based on properties of Marvel Comics.

History
The original Marvel Super Heroes game was published by TSR. It received extensive support from TSR, covering a wide variety of Marvel Comics characters and settings, including a Gamer's Handbook of the Marvel Universe patterned after Marvel's Official Handbook of the Marvel Universe. MSH even received its own column in the (at the time) TSR-published gaming magazine, Dragon, called "The Marvel-phile", which usually spotlighted a character or group of characters that had not yet appeared in a published game product.

Before losing the Marvel license, TSR published a different game using their SAGA System game engine, called the Marvel Super Heroes Adventure Game. This version, written by Mike Selinker, was published in the late 1990s as a card-based game. Though critically praised in various reviews at the time, it never reached a very large market and has since faded into obscurity.

In 2003, after the gaming license had lapsed, the Marvel Universe Roleplaying Game was published by Marvel Comics themselves. This edition uses mechanics that are totally different from any previous versions, using a diceless game mechanic that incorporated a Karma-based resolution system of "stones" (or tokens) to represent character effort. Since its initial publication, a few additional supplements were published by Marvel Comics. However, Marvel stopped supporting the game a little over a year after its initial release.

In 2012, the fourth role playing game set in the Marvel Universe called the Marvel Heroic Roleplaying was published by Margaret Weis Productions under license from Marvel Comics. It was a fast playing game using the Cortex Plus system. In early 2013 Margaret Weis Productions announced they would not be renewing their license.

Supplements

References

TSR, Inc. games
Marvel Comics role-playing games
Marvel Heroes RPG supplements
Lists about role-playing games